Bridge No. 1132 is an open-spandrel concrete arch bridge carrying the two-lane Connecticut Route 80 across the Hammonasset River, between Killingworth and Madison, Connecticut.  Built in 1934, it is one of a small number of open-spandrel concrete bridges in the state, and was noted for its aesthetics at the time of its construction.  It was listed on the National Register of Historic Places in 2004.

Description and history
Bridge No. 1132 is located in western Killingworth and eastern Madison, spanning the Hammonasset River south of Lake Hammonasset. The bridge spans a steep wooded ravine, with its main arch spanning . There are eight supporting concrete beams rising in each spandrel area of the arches.

The bridge was designed by the Connecticut Highway Department and built by the Osborn-Barnes Construction Company of Danbury, Connecticut, in 1934.  It was highlighted by the Highway Department for its scenic location.  The state typically only built open-spandrel bridges for particularly long spans, or sites such as this one with steep sides.  This bridge replaced an older one that had been located further down the ravine; its construction thus eliminated steep approaches on what is a major east-west roadway.

See also
National Register of Historic Places listings in Middlesex County, Connecticut
National Register of Historic Places listings in New Haven County, Connecticut
List of bridges documented by the Historic American Engineering Record in Connecticut
List of bridges on the National Register of Historic Places in Connecticut

References

External links

Road bridges on the National Register of Historic Places in Connecticut
Historic American Engineering Record in Connecticut
Bridges in Middlesex County, Connecticut
Bridges in New Haven County, Connecticut
Bridges completed in 1934
National Register of Historic Places in Middlesex County, Connecticut
National Register of Historic Places in New Haven County, Connecticut
1934 establishments in Connecticut
Killingworth, Connecticut
Madison, Connecticut
Concrete bridges in the United States
Open-spandrel deck arch bridges in the United States